The 1922 United Kingdom general election was held on Wednesday 15 November 1922. It was won by the Conservative Party, led by Prime Minister Andrew Bonar Law, which gained an overall majority over the Labour Party, led by J. R. Clynes, and a divided Liberal Party.

This election is considered one of political realignment, with the Liberal Party falling to third-party status. The Conservative Party went on to spend all but eight of the next forty-two years as the largest party in Parliament, and Labour emerged as the main competition to the Conservatives.

The election was the first not to be held in Southern Ireland, due to the signing of the Anglo-Irish Treaty on 6 December 1921, under which Southern Ireland was to secede from the United Kingdom as a Dominion – the Irish Free State – on 6 December 1922. This reduced the size of the House of Commons by nearly one hundred seats, when compared to the previous election.

Background
The Liberal Party had divided into two factions following the ousting of H. H. Asquith as Prime Minister in December 1916. From then until October 1922 the Conservatives had been in coalition with a Liberal faction (which later became the "National Liberals") led by David Lloyd George. Following the Carlton Club meeting which led to the creating of the 1922 Committee, Lloyd George resigned as Prime Minister and Bonar Law formed a Conservative majority government.

Although still leader of the Liberal Party and a frequent public speaker, former Prime Minister Asquith was no longer a particularly influential figure in the national political debate, and he had played no part in the downfall of the Lloyd George coalition. Most attention was focused on Law and Lloyd George. Asquith's daughter Violet Bonham-Carter, a prominent Liberal Party campaigner, likened the election to a contest between a man with sleeping sickness (Bonar Law) and a man with St Vitus Dance (Lloyd George).

Some of Lloyd George's National Liberals were not opposed by Conservative candidates (e.g. Winston Churchill, who was defeated at Dundee nonetheless), while many leading Conservatives (e.g. former leaders Arthur Balfour and Sir Austen Chamberlain, and former Lord Chancellor Lord Birkenhead) were not members of Bonar Law's government, and hoped to hold the balance of power after the election (comparisons were made with the Peelite group—the ousted Conservative front bench of the late 1840s and 1850s); this was not to be, as Bonar Law won an overall majority.

It was the first election at which Labour surpassed the combined strength of both Liberal parties in votes and seats. The election was also notable for Labour in that it saw future Prime Minister Clement Attlee elected as an MP for Limehouse. 

Some Liberal candidates stood calling for a reunited Liberal Party, while others appear to have backed both Asquith and Lloyd George. Few sources are able to agree on exact numbers, and even in contemporary records held by the two groups, some MPs were claimed for both sides. By one estimate, there were 29 seats where Liberals stood against one another. This is thought to have cost them at least 14 seats, 10 of them to Labour, so in theory a reunited Liberal Party would have been much closer to, and perhaps even ahead of, Labour in terms of seats. However, in reality the two factions were on poor terms, and Lloyd George was still hoping for a renewed coalition with the Conservatives.

Neither of the leaders of the two main parties succeeded in enjoying their achievement in the election for very long; within less than a month of the election, Clynes was defeated in a leadership challenge by former Labour leader Ramsay MacDonald, while Bonar Law would only last a little over seven months as Prime Minister before being forced to step down due to a terminal illness, resulting in Stanley Baldwin succeeding him as both party leader and Prime Minister. As a result, Bonar Law was the shortest-serving UK Prime Minister of the twentieth century. Parliament was dissolved on 26 October.

Party platforms
The Conservative Party offered continuity to the electorate. Bonar Law's election address stated:

The Labour Party proposed to nationalise the mines and railways, to impose a levy on financial capital, and to revise the peace treaties. It promised a higher standard of living for workers, higher wages, and better housing.

Results

|}

Votes summary

Seats summary

Transfers of seats 
 All comparisons are with the 1918 election.
 In some cases the change is due to the MP defecting to the gaining party. Such circumstances are marked with a *.
 In other circumstances the change is due to the seat having been won by the gaining party in a by-election in the intervening years, and then retained in 1922. Such circumstances are marked with a †.

†1 MP elected as an Anti-Waste League candidate at a 1921 by-election, but moved to the Conservatives for the 1922 election

See also
List of MPs elected in the 1922 United Kingdom general election
1922 United Kingdom general election in Scotland
1922 United Kingdom general election in Northern Ireland

Notes

References

Sources

External links
United Kingdom election results—summary results 1885–1979

Manifestos
1922 Conservative manifesto
1922 Labour manifesto
1922 Liberal manifesto

 
General election
General election
1922
November 1922 events
David Lloyd George
Bonar Law
H. H. Asquith